ACPS may refer to:
Alachua County Public Schools
Albemarle County Public Schools
Alexandria City Public Schools